Stadium diplomacy is a form of subsidy practiced by a nation through building and financing the construction of stadiums and sports facilities. China uses this form of soft power to secure diplomatic recognition in line with the One-China policy and to secure natural resources.

The construction of stadiums is financed depending on the project with some given as gifts; paid for through low interest, concessional loans; built in partnership with both credit and the host nation taking on different construction responsibilities; or through some other kind of partnership. This form of diplomacy was practiced as early as 1958, when the Chinese government financed the construction of the National Sports Stadium in neighboring Mongolia.

List
The following includes overseas stadiums and sports facilities built and donated as gifts or financed in association with the host country.  Stadiums built by the creditor nation construction firms but without their government's financing assistance are not listed.

Africa

Estádio 11 de Novembro in Luanda; Estádio Nacional do Chiazi in Cabinda; Ombaka National Stadium in Benguela; Tundavala National Stadium in Lubango were all built by various Chinese contractors for the 2010 Africa Cup of Nations.  Construction was financed by a credit line provided by China.

Friendship Stadium was built with Chinese help in 1982

Stade du 4 Août was built with a total cost of 4 billion CFA francs

An indoor sports stadium built in the downtown area of Yaoundé, was paid for by a Chinese government grant and is used to host sports and cultural events. Chinese construction company also built Limbe Stadium in 2012 and later continued with Kouekong Stadium.

The 15,000 seater National Stadium (2013) construction by Top International Engineering began in 2010 and ended in 2013, at a cost of 1.4 billion Cape Verdean escudos, funded by the Chinese government.

Barthélemy Boganda Stadium was built from 2003 to 2006 at a cost of 12 billion CFA and seats 20,000 spectators.

A new 30,000 seater national stadium, to be named after N'Garta Tombalbaye, is being built in N'Djamena with total cost of 50 billion CFA franc.

Stade des Martyrs, opened in 1994 and was the second largest stadium at that time, was built by Chinese funds.

China State Construction Engineering was one of the companies which built various sport venues in Brazzaville for Congolese preparation to host 2015 All-Africa Games which includes a 60,000 seater main stadium, a multi-sports arena, and an indoor pool.

Djibouti City Stadium was built at the cost of 11 million USD between 1991 and 1993.

Estadio de Bata was built by China Overseas Engineering Group in 2007. Estadio de Malabo was also built with support from Chinese government.

Stade d'Angondjé, also called the Sino-Gabonese Friendship Stadium, was a gift from Chinese government. Chinese government also helped in building Stade d'Oyem and Stade de Port-Gentil when Gabon was selected to host 2017 Africa Cup of Nations.

Independence Stadium was A gift by Chinese government and built in 1984.

China agreed to help in constructing two new stadiums (Sekondi-Takoradi Stadium and Tamale Stadium) and renovate two other stadiums (Baba Yara Stadium and Accra Sports Stadium) in preparation for 2008 Africa Cup of Nations through a soft loan of USD 31 million. Another stadium built by the Chinese, Cape Coast Sports Stadium, sparked a controversy due to its deteriorating condition despite only opened for two years since 2016.

Nongo Stadium is a 50,000 seater stadium finished in 2012 as a gift from Chinese government to the country. As Guinea was selected to host 2025 Africa Cup of Nations, an agreement was signed between two countries to further construct three more stadiums.

Estádio 24 de Setembro is built by China National Corporation For Overseas Economic Cooperation. The stadium was later refurbished also with Chinese help.

Stade Olympique d'Epimbé, a new stadium built for hosting 2023 Africa Cup of Nations, is funded by Chinese government and designed by Beijing Institute Architectural Design.

Moi International Sports Centre, a facility which includes 60,000 seat stadium, 120-room hotel, and large swimming pool was built by the Chinese government as an assistance project in 1987 to enable Kenya host the All Africa Games.  Another Chinese government grant of 12.8 million USD provided funds for the refurbishment of the complex from 2010-2012 by Shengli Engineering Construction.

Samuel Kanyon Doe Sports Complex was built in 1986 with Chinese funds. The stadium was later renovated with Chinese assistance.

Malawi National Stadium was opened in 2017 and costs USD 70 million which is funded by Chinese concessional loan.

Stade du 26 Mars was built by a Chinese construction firm for 2002 Africa Cup of Nations

Nouakchott Olympic Stadium was built in 1985 by Chinese government and later also renovated with Chinese funds in 2017.

The financing for 15,000 seat multi-use Stade Anjalay (1991) was provided by the government of China in the form of a 35 million RMB loan for construction of the stadium and two bridges.    The loan did not carry interest, and had a 10-year grace period and 10 year repayment term.

Moulay Abdallah Stadium was built as an agreement between the Moroccan and Chinese government.

Estádio do Zimpeto, the main venue for 2011 All-Africa Games, is built with US$ 70 million from Chinese government and can hold up to 42,000 spectators.

Both the building of the Stade Général Seyni Kountché and its renovation almost two decades later were funded by Chinese support. Initial construction was handled by the China National Corporation for Overseas Economic Cooperation and renovation construction was handled by the China Geo-Engineering Corporation.

Stade Amahoro (1988) - Construction of this aid project by the China Civil Engineering Construction Corporation started in 1984 and finished in 1988. During the Rwandan genocide the stadium was the safety point which Tutsis tried to escape to as it was secured by UN peacekeepers.

Leopold Senghor Stadium (1985) is a 60,000 seat stadium financed by the Chinese government.

Swimming pool (1992) - The Chinese government assisted in the construction of a swimming pool in 1992 and would later also help out in the renovation of the pool in 2011, in time for the training of Seychellois athletes for the forthcoming Indian Ocean Islands Games.

National Stadium and Bo Stadium (2014)

Mogadishu Stadium (1978) - The stadium seating a capacity of 35,000 was constructed by a Chinese construction firm.  The structure has withstood the long conflict in Somalia, and serves as the staging base for the peacekeeping operations of AMISOM and earlier to that was a base for United Nations Operation in Somalia II, forming part of the backdrop of the events of Black Hawk Down.

A new 15,000 seater stadium in Juba built with Chinese funding has been approved by South Sudanese government.

Uhuru Stadium enlargement (1969); Amaan Stadium (1970); Tanzania National Main Stadium (2007) - Construction work to enlarge the Dar es Salaam stadium was completed in June 1969 based on Chinese aid.  The Amaan Stadium was constructed with Chinese aid in 1970 and underwent refurbishment again with Chinese assistance, reopening in 2010.

Stade de Kégué is built in 2000 by funds from Chinese government.

Mandela National Stadium (1997) - The 40,000 seat stadium opened in 1997 as a donation by the Chinese government.  Another grant by the Chinese government of 3 million in 2011 funded a facelift for the stadium.

Chinese firms are involved in building Levy Mwanawasa Stadium and National Heroes Stadium together with the refurbishment of Independence Stadium.

Chinese government funded both the building of National Sports Stadium in 1987 and its refurbishment in 2006.

Americas 

Sir Vivian Richards Stadium (2007) - Funded by a Chinese government grant, the 60 million USD cricket stadium is a 20,000 seat complex built in time for the 2007 Cricket World Cup.

National Stadium of The Bahamas at Queen Elizabeth Sports Centre (2012) - The 35 million USD stadium was chosen by the government of the Bahamas from among several choices for a substantial gift from China.

Garfield Sobers Gymnasium (1992) - A 6,000 seat sports facility with a swimming pool and facilities for 12 sports in total that was built during 1990-1992 by China State Construction Engineering, based on a grant of 16 million Barbados dollars by the Chinese government.

National Stadium, built following a breakaway from diplomatic recognition of Taiwan in favor of China by the Costa Rican government in 2007, China spent an estimated 100 million USD to construct the stadium from 2008 to 2011.  Local newspaper, the Tico Times called the stadium "Costa Rica’s jewel" and the design "an aerodynamic masterpiece".

Windsor Park (2007) - In exchange for severing diplomatic ties with Taiwan in 2004, the government of China donated the 12,000 seat stadium, constructed and designed at a cost of 45 million East Caribbean dollars by China Civil Engineering Construction Corporation and Wuhan Architectural and Design Institute along with several Dominican engineers sent to China to join the design team.   A local paper covering the opening night described "scenes of raw excitement and drama not seen in Dominica since November 3, 1978 when the island attained political independence from Great Britain...Roseau erupted in a wild frenzy for a moment in time that probably won’t be repeated again in the lifetimes of the thousands gathered to witness it."

National Stadium, is currently under construction in Antiguo Cuscatlán after El Salvador cut ties with Taiwan in 2018 and reestablished ties with China. The stadium's capacity will be 50,000. The announcement was made on 30 December 2021 by Nayib Bukele on Twitter. China will spend an estimated 500 million USD to construct the stadium from 2022 to 2025.

Queen's Park Stadium (2007) - The hurricane damaged stadium was rebuilt as a 40 million USD gift from China in time for the 2007 Cricket World Cup.   The gift from China was provided following the switch in diplomatic allegiance from Taiwan to China in 2005 by the Grenadan government.  Subsequently the Export-Import Bank of Taiwan sued the government of Grenada for defaulting on a loan, part of which was intended to fund the Queen's Park Stadium.

Providence Stadium (2006) - A 15,000 seat cricket stadium. A USD$6 million (euro4.7 million) grant and USD$19 million (euro15 million) in loans by the Government of India.

Phoenix Stadium (2010) - Funded by the United States to replace a soccer stadium destroyed by the Haiti earthquake.

Sligoville mini-stadium (2007), including a 600-seat basketball and netball court; 1,200-seat cricket oval; a 1,500-seat football field; and a 400-metre track circling the football field.  The gift from the government of China was constructed by the Shanxi Construction Engineering Group Corporation.  A site inspection by a journalist from the Jamaica Observer in 2013 found the stadium to be in ruins due to the neglect resulting from a strict policy of not allocating any funds for maintenance.

George Odlum Stadium (2002) - The 9,000 capacity stadium was built with financing by China.   After abandoning ties with China and recognizing Taiwan in 2007, the Taiwanese government provided grant money in 2009 for the refurbishment of the facility and installation of a state of the art track, in time for the Carifta Games.  In the aftermath of a fire that burned down one of two public hospitals in the country, some of stadium facilities were converted into a fully functional hospital with "two operating rooms, an ER Department, as well as a Medical, Paediatric and a Surgical Ward".

Anthony Nesty Sporthal (1987) - An indoor sports hall built by the Chinese government and paid for through a loan extended from China.  The facility is actively used to host sports events, concerts, fairs, and occasional political assemblies for electing the President of Suriname.

Asia

Morodok Techo National Stadium is being built with Chinese funds in preparation for 2023 Southeast Asian Games

New Laos National Stadium (2009) - A sports complex with a 25,000 seat main venue and a 2,000 capacity indoor aquatics complex, with an outdoor warm-up pool, a tennis centre with 2,000 seats, six other tennis courts, two indoor stadiums each with a seating for 3,000 and an indoor shooting range with 50 seats. It was built in time for the 2009 Southeast Asian Games and fully financed by China in a barter agreement with the Laotian government for a large tract of land in the outer capital region.

National Stadium (2010) - With capacity for 5000, the stadium is the largest in the country.  Construction took place from 2008-2010 with financial support from the Chinese government in the form of a 110 million RMB grant.

Thuwunna Stadium and National Theatre of Yangon were built by the Chinese government as gifts in the 1980s, those buildings were also renovated with Chinese help.

Although the stadium was not built by China, separate grants by the Chinese government funded renovation of the Dashrath Stadium in 1999 and 2012.  In the 1999, an international-level synthetic track was installed.   For the 2012 upgrade a 500 KW generator was installed and repairs took care of the 1200-lux floodlights, scoreboard, speakers and sound system.

A stadium located in Damascus built in 1980 by China National Corporation for Overseas Economic Cooperation using Chinese government aid funds.

Europe

Chinese government announced the intention to gift a new national football stadium and a swimming pool to Belarus in 2019.

South Pacific

Telecom Sports Arena (2009) - A 1000-seat sports complex housing netball, volleyball, handball, weightlifting, and squash.  Funding for the $14 million facility came from concessional loans provided by the Chinese government.

FSM-China Friendship Sports Center (2002) - A multipurpose gym built from 1999-2002 by the Guangzhou International Economic And Technical Cooperation Company at a cost of 5 million USD was turned over to FSM from the government of China.

National Hockey Centre - Built with financial assistance from the Chinese government for the 2003 South Pacific Games.

Betia Sports Complex (2006) -  Construction of the sports complex began in 2002 with a 5.5 million USD grant from the government of China.  When Kiribati severed diplomatic ties with China by switching to Taiwan, China suspended work on the partially completed project.  Taiwan restarted construction and the complex opened in 2006.   The facilities include indoor and outdoor basketball courts, a soccer and football ground and a gymnasium seating more than one thousand.

Wewak Sports Stadium (2010) - A stadium was built at a cost of 19 million Kina, the combined contribution of 12 million Kina in funds from the Chinese government and 7 million Kina contributed by Papua New Guinea.

Apia Park Stadium (1983) - A stadium built as an aid project by China for Samoa to host the 7th South-Pacific Games. When it came time in 2007, for Samoa to once again host the games, the Chinese government provided a grant of 19 million USD to refurbish the facilities, using a team of Chinese engineers with local contractors to do the work.

See also
 Panda diplomacy

References

External links
 China's Stadium Diplomacy in Africa by Elliot Ross

Types of diplomacy
Politics and sports
Sport in China
Foreign relations of China
Chinese foreign aid